Bilbil-Kazmalyar is a rural locality (a selo) and the administrative centre of Bilbilsky Selsoviet, Magaramkentsky District, Republic of Dagestan, Russia. The population was 2,042 as of 2010. There are 28 streets.

Geography 
Bilbil-Kazmalyar is located 37 km northeast of Magaramkent (the district's administrative centre) by road, on the left bank of the Yalama River. Khtun-Kazmalyar and Tagirkent-Kazmalyar are the nearest rural localities.

Nationalities 
Lezgins and Rutuls live in the locality.

References 

Rural localities in Magaramkentsky District